Daryl Paul Somers  (né Schulz; 6 August 1951) is an Australian television personality and musician, and a triple Gold Logie award-winner. He rose to national fame as the host and executive producer of the long-running comedy-variety program Hey Hey It's Saturday and continued his television celebrity and status as host of the live-performance program Dancing with the Stars. 

Somers was honoured in 2004 with the award of a Medal of the Order of Australia, and by Australia Post in 2018 by having his portrait featured on a series of postage stamps.

Early life
Somers lived in the Melbourne suburb of Prahran and was educated at the Christian Brothers College, St. Kilda. A drummer, he joined a group playing music in the style of Herb Alpert which began under the name "Pasquale and his Mexican Rhythm". Under the name "Somerset", the group appeared on GTV-9's talent-quest programme New Faces, winning their way to the finals, only to be beaten by John Williamson. His parents and brothers had changed their name from Schulz to Somers by 1970.

Television career

The Hey Hey It's Saturday era (1971–1999)
Somers started professional TV work on 14 July 1971, taking over as the presenter of an afternoon children's program called Cartoon Corner, which was previously Skeeter's Cartoon Corner, hosted by James Kemsley (who went on to draw the famous Ginger Meggs comic strip for 23 years). Daryl's first words were, "Hi, I'm Daryl Somers; Skeeter will no longer be with us, and now it's time for a cartoon."

His audition consisted of him doing an impersonation of Mr Magoo. He was paid $75 ($863.22 in 2022 terms) a week to do the show.

Later that year, on 9 October 1971, Hey Hey It's Saturday started. Somers at first co-hosted with footballer Peter McKenna, but eight weeks later, his co-host became the pink glove puppet Ossie Ostrich, which was operated by Ernie Carroll. McKenna continued to appear on the show for some time. Originally created as a Saturday morning children's cartoon show, the program gradually expanded in both size and scope. Soon, additional cast members joined, including booth announcer John Blackman, who also voiced many (unseen) characters, and, in 1979, co-host Jacki MacDonald.

The program's production crew also began to play a prominent role in the series, with sound-effects technician Murray Tregonning adding humorous sound bites and sound effects from a huge bank of recorded eight-track cartridges, and personnel such as long-serving cameraman "Lucky Phil" Lambert making regular appearances.

Props assistant Ian "Krystal" Murray provided props, most famously the "Dickie Knee" character:

The series' distinctive brand of irreverent humour soon attracted a sizable adult audience, and in 1984 it had become so popular that Nine made the unprecedented decision to move it to a 9:30pm Saturday evening timeslot, and renamed the show Hey Hey It's Saturday Night. It remained on Saturday night for the rest of its run, but it moved to the 6:30pm time slot in 1985 and eventually also reverted to the name Hey Hey It's Saturday. At its height, Hey Hey It's Saturday was one of the most popular and consistently high-rating series in the history of Australian television, winning many awards, including three Gold Logie awards for Somers. In its initial incarnation, Hey Hey screened for 28 years (1971–99) on the Nine Network across Australia. By its final year, the show had become an institution, so it came as a considerable shock when the Nine Network announced that the series was to be axed at the end of 1999.

Family Feud and The Daryl Somers Show (1980–1983)
In 1980, Daryl replaced Tony Barber on the quiz show Family Feud, and hosted the program for three years and 713 episodes. In June 1982, he was given his own night-time TV variety show – without Ossie – in the style of The Don Lane Show aptly named The Daryl Somers Show, which ran for 18 months. Somers still ran Hey Hey during this time. All the hard work paid off with Daryl winning his first Gold Logie Award for Most Popular Personality on Australian TV in 1983. Also in 1983, Somers was crowned King of Moomba with Edna Everage as his Court Jester.

Break (2000–2003)
During the five years after Hey Hey It's Saturday'''s demise in December 1999, Daryl Somers rarely made public appearances, with the exception of a court appearance in 2001 to answer a drink-driving charge (after which Somers admitted he was "a bloody idiot"—a reference to a famous anti-drunk-driving advertising campaign of that time—and an appearance as a guest on the Network Ten program Rove Live. At the ARIA Music Awards of 2000, he received a Special Achievement Award, "for the contribution that Hey Hey It's Saturday made in providing an outlet for Australian artists to showcase their music".

Dancing with the Stars era (2004–2007)
In late 2004, Somers returned to the small screen when he made the move to sign with Nine's arch rival, the Seven Network, hosting Dancing with the Stars, a live program where 10 celebrities compete each week in a dance competition. On 30 November 2007, Somers announced that he would leave Dancing with the Stars. Somers was replaced by actor Daniel MacPherson, who was the host from season 8 till season 14. 

Return of Hey Hey It's Saturday (2009–2010)
Somers had another year off television duties in 2008. Interest had been considered in the reformation of Hey Hey It's Saturday in some capacity. ABC Radio Broken Hill interviewed Corrine Lawrence and Daryl Somers on 22 July 2009 in regards to the growing interest. He revealed the show's return is "not out of the question" and speculated that one or two reunion specials could be made in the near future. A reunion special aired on 30 September 2009. It rated strongly, attracting 3.9+ million viewers, although the second show generated international controversy because of a Jackson 5 parody act (called The Jackson Jive) that appeared on the "Red Faces" segment that featured performers in blackface.

With the success of the Reunion Specials in 2009, the show returned in 2010 as a regular series. The 2010 series had twenty episodes airing, with the first thirteen episodes airing from April until July, with the remaining seven episodes airing in October and November. Hey Hey It's Saturday did not return in 2011 due to falling ratings and the high cost of its production.

You're Back in the Room (2016)
In October 2015, it was announced that Somers would return to the Nine Network to host an Australian version of the British hypnotism game show, You're Back in the Room in 2016.

The Australian version of You're Back in the Room premiered on 3 April 2016, attracting 1.155 million viewers, despite negative reactions on Twitter.

Return to Dancing and Hey Hey 50th anniversary (2021)
In 2021, Dancing with the Stars was revived by the Seven Network, with Somers returning as host. Later that year it was reported that Somers was working on a Hey Hey It's Saturday 50th anniversary special that would air on Seven. The special aired on 10 October 2021, titled Hey Hey It's 50 Years, and drew in 1.2 million viewers.

Music career
Somers released two comedy albums in the mid-1970s, co-credited to Ossie Ostrich. 
In the mid-1980s, Somers was signed to Brian Cadd's label Graffiti Records. The pair worked on a pop album that was ultimately shelved. In Cadd's 2010 autobiography, he said (of Somers) "making that album, he was undoubtedly the hardest working person I'd ever been with in the studio" adding "It was a truly fun project. However, there was one serious flaw that finally beat us. Daryl's voice was just too classically trained. He could get it right down to the very edge of pop but there was always that slight cabaret vibrato that gave him away."

Somers released an album on the Sony BMG label titled Songlines in 2005.

Albums
 Hey! Hey! It's Daryl & Ossie – Hammard (1975)
 Keep Smiling With Daryl & Ossie – Hammard (1976)
 Songlines – Sony BMG (2005)

Singles
 "What's Forever For" / "Can I See You Tonight?" (1981)
 "Don't Want To Share Your Love" / "You Look Just Like A Heartache To Me" (1985)

List of TV programs
 New Faces, 1968, runner-up contestant
 New Faces, 1970, winning contestant
 Cartoon Corner, 1971–1977 host
 Hey Hey it's Saturday, 1971–1999, 2009–2010, host and producer
 Bandstand, 1976, host
 King of Pop Awards, 1976–1977, host
 The Graham Kennedy Show, 1970s regular artist
 The Don Lane Show, 1970s regular artist
 The Mike Walsh Show, 1970s regular artist
 Family Feud, 1980–1983, host
 Countdown, 1981, guest host
 The Daryl Somers Show, 1982–1983, host
 Blankety Blanks, host, 1985
 TV Week Logie Awards, host, 1988, 1991, 1996–1998, 2006
 New Faces, host and producer, 1989
 The Russell Gilbert Show, producer, 1998
 Gonged But Not Forgotten, producer (1999)
 Dancing with the Stars, host, 2004–2007, 2021–present
 You're Back in the Room, host, 2016

 Awards and recognition 
In the Australia Day 2004 honours list, Somers was awarded a Medal of the Order of Australia "for service to the television and entertainment industries, to charitable organisations and to the community". In 2018, Australia Post featured his portrait on a series of postage stamps to commemorate that he had “made unique contributions to the Australian entertainment industry and ... played a role in forming our national popular culture”.

Mo Awards
The Australian Entertainment Mo Awards (commonly known informally as the Mo Awards), were annual Australian entertainment industry awards. They recognise achievements in live entertainment in Australia from 1975 to 2016. Daryl Somers won one award in that time.
 (wins only)
|-
| 1999
| Daryl Somers
| John Campbell Fellowship Award
| 
|-

Somers has been a part of the Logies since his early days of television, either as host, winner, or nominee. He has been host five times (1988, 1991, 1996, 1997, 1998) and co-host in 2006.

Logies nominated: 
 Gold Logie – 12 times (1984–1985, 1987–1988, 1990–1991, 1993–1998)
 Most Popular Light Entertainment Personality – once (1994)
 Most Popular Comedy Personality – once (1997)

Other work
In 2013, Somers was announced as part of the performing line-up of Harvest Rain Theatre Company's 2014 season, playing Nicely Nicely Johnson of Guys and Dolls.

 Controversy 
Despite the enduring popularity of Hey Hey'' with viewers, in recent years the show has come under criticism for being backward and culturally insensitive, with its outlook and many of its jokes now considered by some commentators to be racist, sexist, and homophobic. The international controversy surrounding the use of blackface in the Jackson Jive sketch on "Red Faces" in 2009 led to the show being derided as "old fashioned, out of touch, stale, [and] misguided". Somers himself had also appeared in brownface or blackface on multiple episodes, including a tribute to the late Ricky May in 1988 and in blackface to make fun of singer and frequent guest Kamahl. In 2021, Somers stated that he believed that some of the content that aired on the show in the past would not be acceptable today due to “political correctness and the cancel culture”; his remarks faced additional criticism.

Kamahl has stated that his ethnicity and background were often the butt of jokes during his appearances on the show, likening his treatment to being humiliated. In April 2021, Somers wrote a lengthy apology to Kamahl and to those who found the show's content offensive. Kamahl unreservedly accepted Somers' apology.

See also
Somers Carroll Productions
Ernie Carroll

References

External links
 
 Brief bio
 Will Somers never end? – Sydney Morning Herald, 5 May 2006 article describing Somers winning a TV Fugly Award

1951 births
Living people
ARIA Award winners
Australian drummers
Australian male singers
Australian game show hosts
Gold Logie winners
People educated at St Mary's College, Melbourne
People from Prahran, Victoria
Recipients of the Medal of the Order of Australia
Musicians from Geelong
Television personalities from Melbourne
Male actors from Geelong